Jan Švéda (5 November 1931 – 14 December 2007) was a Czech rower who competed for Czechoslovakia in the 1956 Summer Olympics and in the 1960 Summer Olympics.

He was born in Břeclav. In 1956 he was a crew member of the Czechoslovak boat which was eliminated in the semi-finals of the eight event. Four years later he won the bronze medal with the Czechoslovak boat in the eights competition.

External links
 profile

1931 births
2007 deaths
Czech male rowers
Czechoslovak male rowers
Olympic rowers of Czechoslovakia
Rowers at the 1956 Summer Olympics
Rowers at the 1960 Summer Olympics
Olympic bronze medalists for Czechoslovakia
Olympic medalists in rowing
Medalists at the 1960 Summer Olympics
People from Břeclav
European Rowing Championships medalists
Sportspeople from the South Moravian Region